Xue Lei is a paralympic athlete from China competing mainly in category T11 sprint events.

Xue competed at the 2012 Paralympic Games in London where he could only manage fourth in his semifinal in the 200m. He managed to win the gold medal in the 100m and was part of the Chinese team that finished 0.02 seconds behind the gold medal-winning Russian team who broke the world record.

References

Paralympic athletes of China
Athletes (track and field) at the 2012 Summer Paralympics
Paralympic gold medalists for China
Paralympic silver medalists for China
Chinese male sprinters
Living people
Year of birth missing (living people)
Medalists at the 2012 Summer Paralympics
Paralympic medalists in athletics (track and field)
21st-century Chinese people